King Baby may refer to:
King Baby (album), by comedian Jim Gaffigan
"King Baby", an episode of CSI: Crime Scene Investigation
King Baby, a book by Kate Beaton